The 1999 Guardian Direct Cup was a men's tennis tournament played on indoor carpet courts in London, Great Britain, that was part of the Championship Series of the 1999 ATP Tour. It was the 22nd edition of the tournament and was held 22–28 February.

Seeds
Champion seeds are indicated in bold text while text in italics indicates the round in which those seeds were eliminated.

Draw

Finals

References

Doubles
Milan Indoor
1999 in English tennis
Tennis in London
Tennis tournaments in England